Skąpe may refer to the following places:
Skąpe, Greater Poland Voivodeship (west-central Poland)
Skąpe, Kuyavian-Pomeranian Voivodeship (north-central Poland)
Skąpe, Świętokrzyskie Voivodeship (south-central Poland)
Skąpe, Lubusz Voivodeship (west Poland)
Skąpe, West Pomeranian Voivodeship (north-west Poland)